"Ogunde" is the opening track on jazz saxophonist John Coltrane's 1967 album Expression, and one of two songs on The Olatunji Concert: The Last Live Recording.

Origins and composition 
"Ogunde" is the opening track on Expression, Coltrane's final studio album,
recorded on February 15 and March 7, 1967.  At 3:36 minutes, it is the shortest song on the album.
A "marathon version" of the song that lasted for more than 28 minutes
was performed in concert on April 23, 1967 during Coltrane's last recorded live performance in the Olatunji Center for African Culture in Harlem
and was released in 2001 on The Olatunji Concert: The Last Live Recording.

The original release of "Ogunde" features Coltrane on tenor, Rashied Ali on drums, Alice Coltrane on piano, and Jimmy Garrison on bass.  The Olatunji Concert release also features percussionists Juma Santos and Algie de Witt and saxophonist Pharoah Sanders, who makes a single appearance in Expression on "To Be", on piccolo flute.

According to David Wild's liner notes, the song is based on "Ogunde Varere", an Afro-Brazilian folk song whose title translates to 'Prayer of the Gods'.  Independent journalist and author
Gérald Arnaud further noted that "Ogunde" is dedicated to the Orisha Ogun, the god of iron and of metal in the Yoruba religious tradition.
Meanwhile, Chris Searle of The Morning Star contended that the song "re-emphasises Coltrane's amalgam of spiritual passion within the huge sound of his solidarity with the African people".

Music and structure 
"Ogunde" is a free jazz ballad;  however, literary historian Kimberly Benston notes that the song deviates from the traditional "expectations of closure aroused by the underlying ballad structure".  Jeff Pressing of the University of Melbourne notes "Ogunde" as an example of a song that "juxtapose[s] lyrical directness with eruptions of broken quasi-atonality".

PopMatters reviewer James Beaudreau further notes that Coltrane's performance in "Ogunde" reflects the personal style that he evolved prior to his death: "ecstatic, brightly focused, and with a kaleidoscopic vibrato".  According to Beaudreau, the starting phrase of "Ogunde", which features Coltrane, "sounds like an ending, as if the whole of the music could be summed up in a single noble cadence".  The song is characterized by a sequence that features multiple performers and sounds and includes a fourteen-minute period, starting at 2:40, for which Coltrane is completely absent, and which is dominated by the sounds of Sanders' saxophone and Alice Coltrane's piano, as well as lengthy solos by Coltrane, Sanders, and Alice.

Reception 
On the whole, "Ogunde" was well received by critics.  Discussing Coltrane's music in the months prior to his death in July 1967, jazz musician and educator Bill Cole noted that although Coltrane's "recording output during 1967 ... was sparse," the "quality and strength, especially on his piece 'Ogunde', show no detrimental effects from his illness."  Jazz commentator Scott Yanow praised The Olatunji Concert for its "unremittingly intense music", but called it "largely unlistenable except by true fanatics" due to poor recording quality, stating that the recording "should have remained legendary and unissued".

BBC reviewer Peter Marsh characterized Coltrane's solo performance during the song as "a gripping, restless examination of repeated phrases, accelerated at dizzying speed till they break up and regroup" and describes the performance as one having both "power and grace".

Many reviews of "Ogunde" give special attention to Sanders' performance in the extended version of the song.  Don Heckman of the Los Angeles Times praised Sanders' performance, asserting that "Sanders is at his very best on 'Ogunde'".
Beaudreau offered a mixed assessment, finding "Sanders’ endurance" to be "impressive" and his performance "attractive and admirable", but noting that the performance tests his "tolerance for extended and insistent shrill wailing" and that "the lack of warmth here leaves me out in the cold, so to speak".

Appearances 
In addition to Expression and Olatunji Concert, versions of "Ogunde" have been featured on several other albums, including His Greatest Years, Vol. 2: The Best of John Coltrane (MCA, 1990),
Spiritual (Impulse!, 2001),
and The Impulse Story (Impulse!, 2006).
The song is also featured in Sacred Sources, Vol. 1: Live Forever, a compilation album released in 1994 by Carlos Santana's record label Guts & Grace that features recordings from the final performances of famous artists.
A short excerpt of "Ogunde" also appears on The Last Giant: Anthology, a 1993 release by Rhino Records.

"Ogunde" was one of fifteen compositions performed in 2003 at Mechanics Hall in Worcester, Massachusetts for the 26th Annual John Coltrane Memorial Concert.

Notes

References

External links
 Ogunde: John Coltrane and Afro-Atlantic Mythopoesis, an article by Wu Ming 1 on the Yoruba origins of the song.

1967 songs
Jazz songs
Compositions by John Coltrane